George Lee McLeod (January 3, 1931 – January 15, 2023) was an American basketball player. A forward, he played in the National Basketball Association (NBA), and was drafted by the Milwaukee Hawks in the 1952 NBA draft. In 1953, he was traded along with Don Boven and Pete Darcey to the Baltimore Bullets for Stan Miasek and Dave Minor.

McLeod died on January 15, 2023, at the age of 92.

References

1931 births
2023 deaths
American men's basketball players
Baltimore Bullets (1944–1954) players
Basketball players from Texas
Forwards (basketball)
Milwaukee Hawks draft picks
People from Greenville, Texas
TCU Horned Frogs men's basketball players